Maria Marten is a 1928 British silent drama film directed by Walter West starring Trilby Clark, Warwick Ward and Dora Barton. It is based on the real story of the Red Barn Murder in the 1820s, and is one of five film versions of the events. The film shifted the action to fifty years earlier to the height of the Georgian era. This was the last of the silent film adaptations of the Maria Marten story, and its success paved the way for the much better 1935 sound film remake starring Tod Slaughter. A 35mm print of the 1928 silent film exists in the British Film Institute's archives.

Plot
When his secret lover Maria Marten tells him she is pregnant with his child and asks him to marry her, the villainous Squire Corder murders her and buries her body in the red barn. The dead woman's ghost later visits her mother in a dream, and leads her to find her daughter's body, incriminating the squire.

Cast
 Trilby Clark as Maria Marten
 Warwick Ward as Squire William Corder
 Dora Barton 
 James Knight as Carlos
 Charles Ashton as Sam Giles
 Vesta Sylva as Ann Marten
 Frank Perfitt as John Marten
 Margot Armand as Lady Maud Derringham
 Judd Green as William Giles
 Tom Morris as Ishmael
 Chili Bouchier

References

Bibliography
 Chapman, Gary. London's Hollywood: The Gainsborough Studio in the Silent Years. Edditt, 2014.
 Low, Rachael. History of the British Film, 1918-1929. George Allen & Unwin, 1971.

External links

1928 films
British silent feature films
British historical drama films
1920s historical drama films
Films directed by Walter West
Films set in Suffolk
Films set in England
Films set in the 19th century
British black-and-white films
1928 drama films
1920s English-language films
1920s British films
Silent drama films